Gail Schoettler (née Sinton; born October 21, 1943) is a retired American politician and businesswoman who served as the 44th Lieutenant Governor of Colorado and 50th Colorado State Treasurer. In the 1998 gubernatorial election, Schoettler was the Democratic nominee for Governor of Colorado, losing to Republican Bill Owens by just 7,783 votes.

Early life and education 
Schoettler was born Gail Sinton in Los Angeles, California on October 21, 1943. Schoettler's father was a cattle rancher and member of the Shandon school board. Schoettler has a brother and twin sister. Schoettler grew up on a cattle ranch in Shandon, California.

In 1965, Schoettler earned a Bachelor of Art degree in economics from Stanford University. Schoettler earned a master's degree and PhD degree in African History from University of California, Santa Barbara.

Career 
Schoettler became a research assistant for an African Studies professor at University of Denver's Graduate School of International Studies, earning $2.50 an hour.

In 1975, Schoettler co-founded and became the President of the Denver Children Museum in Denver, Colorado, until 1985. In the same year, Schoettler co-founded Women's Bank of Denver.

Politics 
In 1979, Schoettler became a member of Board of Education in Douglas County, Colorado. Schoettler served until 1987. In 1983, Schoettler became an Executive Director of the Colorado Department of Personnel,

On November 4, 1986, Schoettler became the 50th Colorado State Treasurer. Schoettler defeated Dick Sargent and Joseph M. Nelson with 51.60% of the votes. On November 6, 1990, as an incumbent, Schoettler won the election and continued serving as Treasurer of Colorado. Schoettler defeated Dick Sargent and Karen Thiessen with 53.74% of the votes.

In 1994, Schoettler was elected Lieutenant Governor of Colorado as the running mate of Roy Romer. On November 3, 1998, Schoettler lost the election as the Democratic nominee for Governor of Colorado. Schoettler was defeated by Bill Owens with 48.43% of the votes. Schoettler was defeated by 7,783 votes.

Post-government career 
Schoettler and Judi Wagner started a women's group that would raise money to support women candidates. Schoettler cofounded Electing Women and Electing Women Alliance. In 1999, Schoettler was appointed as the U.S. Ambassador of 2000 World Radiocommunication Conference, hosted in Istanbul, Turkey. Schoettler is the owner of eGlobalEducation, a travel company.

Personal life 
At 21 years old, Schoettler married John Schoettler, a geologist, and they moved to Santa Barbara, California. In 1969, the Schoettlers moved to Colorado. The couple divorced in 1988, and in 1990, Gail Schoettler married Dr. Donald Stevens, Dean of the University of Colorado at Denver College of Business.  Schoettler has three children and two step-children, and  lives in Parker, Colorado.

See also
List of female lieutenant governors in the United States
 1998 Colorado gubernatorial election

References

External links 
 2000 World Radiocommunication Conference at ITU.int
  Children' Museum of Denver
 Gail Schoettler at cogreatwomen.org

|-

|-

1943 births
Colorado Democrats
Lieutenant Governors of Colorado
Living people
State treasurers of Colorado
Women in Colorado politics
20th-century American politicians
20th-century American women politicians
Politicians from Los Angeles
People from San Luis Obispo County, California
Stanford University alumni
University of California, Santa Barbara alumni
Recipients of the Legion of Honour
Candidates in the 1998 United States elections
People from Parker, Colorado